Anastasy Andreyevich Vonsyatsky (June 12, 1898 – February 5, 1965), better known in the United States as Anastase Andreivitch Vonsiatsky, was a Russian anti-Bolshevik émigré and fascist leader based in the United States from the 1920s.

He became a naturalized American citizen while leading a splinter far-right organization, the Russian National Revolutionary Labor and Workers Peasant Party of Fascists. The headquarters of the RFO were based in Putnam, Connecticut.  Vonsyatsky was charged with the support of secret contacts with agents of Nazi Germany and arrested by the FBI in 1942, following the United States' entry into war with Germany and Japan. Released early from prison in 1946, Vonsyatsky lived out the remainder of his life in the United States. He died in St. Petersburg, Florida, in 1965.

Early life
Anastasy Andreyevich Vonsyatsky was born in Warsaw, Poland (then part of the Russian Empire). His family, though Polish in origin, was known for its long devotion to the Russian czars; one of Vonsyatsky's paternal great-grandfather had been handed a comital estate from the Romanovs, which allowed him to use the courtesy title of Count. His father, Andrei Nikolaevich, was an army officer assassinated at a Radom office of the Imperial Gendarmes by a Polish revolutionary in 1910. His mother was Nina Anastasievna Plyuschevskaya.

Vonsyatsky was educated at a military prep school in Moscow and the Emperor Nicholas II Cavalry Academy in Saint Petersburg, Russia.

Military career

Vonsyatsky embarked upon a military career in the Imperial Russian Army during the reign of Nicholas II. After the revolutionary events of October 1917, which brought the Leninist Bolsheviks to power and climaxed in the protracted Russian Civil War of 1917–1923, Vonsyatsky, newly admitted to St. Petersburg as a military cadet, took part in the anti-Bolshevik opposition and served in the counter-revolutionary White movement, first seeing action against the Red Army at Rostov. Leaving the White Army's stronghold in the Crimean Peninsula with the departing forces of General Wrangel, he was evacuated to western Europe in 1920.

Traveling through Constantinople and France, Vonsyatsky arrived in the United States in 1922. In March 1930, Vonsyatsky was given an American reserve officer's commission and appointed a first lieutenant of the United States Army Reserve; the military commission would eventually expire in 1935.

Political activity
Forming political connections within the émigré circles after establishing himself outside Russia, Vonsyatsky was, at one point in the interwar period, a leader of the Russian Fascist Organization, an initially independent movement that later became closely associated with the Manchuria-based Russian Fascist Party (RFP). Vonsyatsky split from the RFP in 1933. On March 10, 1933, he founded the Russian National Revolutionary Labor and Workers Peasant Party of Fascists (also referred to as the All Russian National Revolutionary Party, or the All-Russian National Revolution Toilers and Worker Peasants Fascist Party (VRO)), another anti-Soviet and anti-communist organization. The headquarters were established at the Vonsyatsky estate in Connecticut and published a newspaper called Fashist.

Despite earlier publications supplemented by photographs of German soldiers beneath such titles as "The Army of the Holy Swastika" and continuing collaboration with the German-American Bund elements during World War II, in public appeals amid the growing anti-German sentiment of the early 1940s, Vonsyatsky's addresses to his target audience struck a different tone. Among other statements, Vonsyatsky wrote:

In 1934, Vonsyatsky's organization merged with the Russian Fascist Party, another fascist political organization led by Konstantin Rodzaevsky and headquartered in Tokyo, Japan. However, they soon parted ways.

In summer 1940, Vonsyatsky's publications declared the following:

Vonsyatsky became a subject of FBI investigation and was indicted in 1942 for connections with proxies for German interests, including key participants in the pro-Nazi German-American Bund, whose leader, Fritz Kuhn, had previously been assisted by Vonsyatsky's bail money in 1939. Among other contacts was the American Hitler admirer William Dudley Pelley. Indicted for conspiring to assist Hitler's Germany in violation of the Espionage Act alongside fellow conspirators Wilhelm Kunze, Dr. Otto Willumeit, Dr. Wolfgang Ebell, and Reverend Kurt E. B. Molzahn, Vonsyatsky submitted a guilty plea after first protestations of innocence, and was convicted under the 1917 Espionage Act by a jury in Hartford, Connecticut on June 22, 1942. The lead prosecutor in the case was Thomas J. Dodd, a future U.S. Senator who went on to prosecute Nazi war criminals at the Nuremberg trials following the end of the war.

Vonsiatsky was sentenced to five years in prison and fined $5000. He was imprisoned at the United States Medical Center for Federal Prisoners in Springfield, Missouri. Vonsiatsky was released from prison on February 26, 1946.

After his release from prison, Vonsyatsky moved to St. Petersburg, Florida, where he wrote articles in Russian newspapers and journals. He authored a book entitled Rasplata (Retribution) about World War II, where "he accused the Japanese government, Franklin D. Roosevelt, and his personal nemesis, Thomas J. Dodd, of hampering the anti-Soviet cause". Meanwhile, Vonsyatsky dedicated the Tsar Nicholas II Museum in St Petersburg, Florida.

Personal life
Vonsiatsky was married twice. He first married Lyuba Muromsky (rus. Muromskaya) in Ukraine on January 31, 1920.

On February 4, 1922, still married to Lyuba, Vonsiatsky married Marion Buckingham Ream, the daughter of businessman Norman B. Ream, and a multi-millionaire heiress by the time they married. He became a naturalized citizen of the United States in the Superior Court of Windham County, Putnam, Connecticut, on September 30, 1927, after Marion appealed to Secretary of State Charles Evans Hughes. Two months after his second marriage, he was accused of bigamy by his legal wife Lyuba; in November 1922, nine months after Vonsiatsky become a bigamist, the US federal government and the Russian Orthodox Church granted him an annulment of the marriage to Lyuba. The Vonsiatskys resided at Quinnatisset Farm in Putnam, Connecticut.

Vonsiatsky separated from Ream and started a romantic relationship with Edith Priscilla Royster in 1948. In July 1950, Vonsiatsky and Royster had a son together, Andre Anastase Vonsiatsky. In May 1952, the courts granted Vonsiatsky and Ream a legal separation. Ream continued to take care of Vonsiatsky and his son financially, setting up a $12,000 trust for the boy in 1958, and leaving Vonsiatsky $25,000 when she died in 1963 .

Vonsiatsky died February 5, 1965, from coronary thrombosis.

Death and legacy

Vonsyatsky died of coronary thrombosis on February 5, 1965, in St. Petersburg, Florida at Mound Park Hospital, at 66. His body was interred at West Thompson Cemetery in Thompson, Connecticut.

Many of the documents of Vonsyatsky were stored in the archives of the Hoover Institution in California, in the collection of Professor John Stephan, author of The Russian Fascists: Tragedy and Farce in Exile, 1925–1945, and Providence College, Phillips Memorial Library.

References

Further reading

 The Russian Fascists: Tragedy and Farce in Exile, 1925–1945 by John J. Stephan 
 
 К. В. Родзаевский. Завещание Русского фашиста. М., ФЭРИ-В, 2001 
 А.В. Окороков. Фашизм и русская эмиграция (1920–1945 гг.). М., Руссаки, 2002 
 Н.Н. Грозин. Защитные рубашки. Шанхай: Издательство Всероссийский Русский Календарь, 1939.
 FBI History. Famous Cases. Vonsiatsky Espionage. N.B.: the article confuses the political term "White Russian" (or "White émigré") with Belarusian origin, as Belarus was then often referred to as "White Russia".
 The Great Conspiracy: The Secret War Against Soviet Russia (1946)
 Knútr Benoit: Konstantin Rodzaevsky. Dict, 2012,

External links

 
 Inventory to the John J. Stephan Collection, 1932—1978

1898 births
1965 deaths
Russian anti-communists
American anti-communists
American fascists
American people convicted of spying for Nazi Germany
American prisoners and detainees
Members of the Russian Fascist Organization
Members of the Russian Fascist Party
Old Right (United States)
People from Thompson, Connecticut
Military personnel from Warsaw
People of the Russian Civil War
People who emigrated to escape Bolshevism
People convicted under the Espionage Act of 1917
Russian collaborators with Nazi Germany
Russian collaborators with Imperial Japan
Russian people of Polish descent
United States Army officers
White Russian emigrants to the United States
Nazi politicians
Prisoners and detainees of the United States federal government